David Earl (born 1951) is a South African composer and pianist. He was educated at Rondebosch Boys' High School. He made his professional debut at the age of sixteen when he broadcast Bach, Chopin and Chabrier on the SABC. In 1968, he performed Felix Mendelssohn's Piano Concerto No 1 with the Cape Town Symphony Orchestra. In 1971, he moved to London where he studied at Trinity College of Music. He studied under Jacob Kaletsky and Richard Arnell. After a live début broadcast recital on BBC Radio 3 in 1974, his first recital at Wigmore Hall was reported as "stylish and powerful" by The Times. In 1975, he was selected as one of the Young Musicians of the Year by the Greater London Arts Association. He also won first prize in the 1976 SABC Piano Competition. He was described by The Daily Telegraph as having "remarkable gifts of style, technical mastery and artistry". He made his début as a composer in the 1977 when he premiered his own Piano Suite No 1 Mosaics at Wigmore Hall. His concerto repertoire includes the Viennese classics, many from the nineteenth century, and amongst those from the 20th, the piano concertos of Arthur Bliss and John Joubert, both of which he studied with the composers. Conductors he has appeared with include Hugo Rignold, Maurice Handford, Piero Gamba and Christian Badea.

Career
His professional career as a composer began in 1980 with the premiere of 'Chéri' an hour-long ballet commissioned by Peter Darrell for The Scottish Ballet, given at that year's Edinburgh Festival, and frequently revived, with a new production by The Hong Kong Ballet in 1989. To date there have been six more ballet commissions, including two for CAPAB Ballet – 'The Return of the Soldier' (1982) and 'Abelard and Heloise' (1985), both choreographed by Veronica Paeper, and a full-evening 'Macbeth' (1991) for Ballet de Santiago in Chile, choreographed by Andre Prokovsky. David had recently collaborated with the Royal Ballet choreographer Vanessa Fenton on two smaller works mounted in Cambridge in 2009.

Piano Concerto No 1 appeared in 1980, followed by a Two-Piano Concerto (1986), concertos for Violin (1991), Cello (1996), Trumpet (2005), Piano Concerto No 2 (2007) and a Double Violin Concerto (2011). Among choral compositions is a symphonic setting of Wordsworth's 'Intimations of Immortality', a cyclic setting of George Herbert 'Mans' Medley', and 'Island Owl' for soloists, children's chorus and orchestra.

Chamber works include two sonatas each for violin and cello, a Clarinet Trio, Piano Quintet, String Quartet, and for solo piano, three Suites: 'Mosaics', 'Gargoyles' and 'Mandalas', as well as 'Oxymorons: 24 Preludes'.

He was introduced to the world of writing film music by the producer David Puttnam and wrote for a number of productions between 1982 and 1987, in particular 'P'Tang Yang Kipperbang' (directed by Michael Apted), and 'Arthur's Hallowed Ground' (directed by the veteran cinematographer Freddie Young).

David has been fortunate in collaborating with young musicians at the start of their careers – Tasmin Little, Martin Roscoe, Alexander Chaushian and Jamie Campbell gave the first performances of, respectively, the Violin Concerto, Violin Sonata No 1, the Cello Concerto, and Violin Sonata No2.

The CD of the Cello Sonata and 'Mandalas' Piano Suite received a Gramophone Editor's recommendation rossette, and was nominated by International Piano magazine for best new music recording 2007.

In June 2012 his setting of Rupert Brooke's 'The Old Vicarage, Grantchester' for baritone chorus and orchestra, commissioned by Dame Mary Archer to mark the poem's centenary, was given its first performance at the Fitzwilliam Museum, Cambridge, with the Cambridge University Chamber Orchestra, members of the choirs of Clare and Gonville and Caius College, and Nicholas Mogg as baritone soloist.

Recent first performances include a new Clarinet Concerto, premiered in October 2013 in Durban, South Africa, with Maria du Toit, clarinet, and the KwaZuluNatal Philharmonic Orchestra under Arjan Tien.

Within the last few years David has completed two full length operas: Mary and the Conqueror in which Alexander the Great and Mary Renault meet in the afterlife; and 'Strange Ghost', composed to mark the centenary of the death of the iconic poet Rupert Brooke. The latter was premiered in Cambridge in December 2015, directed
by Dionysios Kyropoulos, and conducted by Dominic Peckham with James Schouten in the title role.

David teaches piano performing to undergraduates at Cambridge University, and is a supervisor for Tripos Composition students. In 2001 he was ordained into the then Western Buddhist Order (now Triratna Buddhist Order) and given the Order name of Akashadeva ('deity of etheric space'). Some of his musical compositions show influences from this immersion in Buddhist thinking, in particular the piano suite Mandalas, whose four movements are inspired among others by the vajras of Indian mythology, the lotus symbol and the Five Dhyani Buddhas that represent the five key qualities of the Buddha.

In 2017 two new works were premiered: Piano Suite No 4 Darshanas, and a Duo Sonata for Viola and Double Bass, the latter a commission from the South African double bass virtuoso Leon Bosch, for whom David has also written Nocturne: Old Nectar for Bass and Piano.

A setting of Stephen Spender's poem The Truly Great was composed for Anglia Ruskin University's 25th Anniversary Songbook in 2017. A song cycle for baritone and piano, Sangharakshita Songs, was premiered in Cambridge in October 2018.

Recent compositions include a Piano Sextet, and A Carbon Symphony. The latter work was recorded by The Royal Scottish National Orchestral in October 2019, in collaboration with The Deep Carbon Observatory in Washington DC.

In 2019 a piano piece Metta Bhavana was commissioned for the second Triennial Olga Kern International Piano Competition in Albuquerque, New Mexico.

Recently completed is a new opera Lawrence of Arabia (2021).

Filmography 

 P'Tang Yang Kipperbang, 1984
 The Price, 1985
 Arthur's Hallowed Ground, 1986

Ballets 

 Ballet in one act: Chéri (1978)
 Ballet in one act: Return of the Soldier (1980–81)
 Ballet in one act: Abelard and Heloise (1983)
 Ballet in one act: The Nightingale and the Rose (1983)
 Ballet in two acts: Macbeth (1991)
 Dance theatre: Highland Journal (1995)
 Ballet: Wind and Wings (2009)
 Ballet: Ode to Memory (2009)

Operas 

 Opera in two acts: Hamlet (1984)
 Opera in two acts: The Go-Between (1991)
 Mary and the Conqueror (2013)
 Strange Ghost (2015)
 Lawrence of Arabia (2021)

Other works 

 Piano Suite No 1 Mosaics (1977)
 Piano Concerto No 1 (1977–78)
 Lord, make me an instrument of Thy peace – setting of St Francis of Assisi for SATB (1979)
 Concerto for Two Pianos and Orchestra (1983)
 Incidental music for Dance of the Defectors (Lot's Wife) (1983–84)
 I will lift up mine eyes unto the hills – Psalm 121 for soprano and piano (1984)
 Violin Concerto (1985)
 Piano Suite No 2 Gargoyles (1986–89)
 Choral Symphony Trumpets from the Steep (1987)
 3 Intermezzi for Piano Caryatids (1991)
 Sonata No 1 for Violin and Piano (1991)
 24 Preludes for Piano Oxymorons (1993)
 Man's Medley – choral and orchestral settings of George Herbert (1993)
 Cello Concerto (1994)
 Highland Journal – dance/theatre score with piano, tenor roles (1995)
 Piano Suite No 3 Mandalas (1996)
 To a Nobleman in Kyoto – settings of Kukai for baritone and piano (1997)
 Sonata No 2 for Violin and Piano (1997)
 Sonata for Cello and Piano (1998)
 Invocation to Manjughosa – Violin and Piano (2002)
 Theme and Variations – transcription for piano of the 4th movement from Tchaikovsky's Suite No 3 Op 55 (2002)
 Trumpet Concerto (2005)
 Piano Concerto No 2 (2006)
 Praise the Lord for all our parents (SATB with organ; also SATB with orchestra) (2008)
 Old Roses for solo piano (2008)
 Trio for Clarinet, Cello and Piano (2008)
 Quintet for Piano and Strings (2008)
 Wind and Wings for Wind Trio and Harp (2009)
 Sonata for Oboe and Piano (2009)
 Sonatina for Piano (2009)
 Ode to Memory for string quartet, clarinet, flute and harp (2009)
 Island Owl – Songs for children of all ages for vocal soloists, chorus and orchestra (2010)
 String Quartet (2010)
 Nocturne for Cello and Piano (2010)
 Chios Rhapsody for solo piano (2010)
 Jonathan's Grace Notes – four easy pieces for piano (2010)
 Ode on a Grecian Urn (Keats) – for soprano and piano (2010)
 The Fairy Garden – five easy pieces for flute and piano (2011)
 Double Violin Concerto (2011)
 The Ungathered Blossom of Quiet – a Rupert Brooke song cycle for tenor and piano (2011)
 Sonata for Cello and Piano No 2 (2011)
 The Old Vicarage, Grantchester (2012) for baritone, chorus and orchestra
 Encore – piano variations on Chopsticks (2012)
 From hearts that live in grace – waltzes for piano (2012)
 Scenes from Childhood – 9 pieces for piano solo (2012)
 Clarinet Concerto (2013)
 Scenes from a South African Childhood - 9 pieces for solo piano (2013)
 Sonata for Viola and Piano (2014) 
 The Wineland Suite - versions for orchestra and brass/woodwind (2014)
 Quintet for Cor Anglais and Strings (2014)
 Barcarolle - solo piano (2014)
 Song without Words - solo piano (2014)
 Concerto for Double Bass and Orchestra (2015)
 Viola Concerto (2015)
 Duo Sonata for Viola and Double Bass (2016)
 Piano Suite No 4 Darshanas (2016)
 The Truly Great (Stephen Spender setting for tenor and piano/chorus and orchestra 2018)
 Sangharakshita Poems - a cycle of 8 songs for baritone and piano (2018)
 Symphony in C - a Carbon Symphony (2019)
 Metta Bhavana for solo piano (2019)
 Piano Concerto No 3 (2020)
 15 Bagatelles for Cello, Clarinet and Piano (2020)

External links 
 
 Cape Town International Summer Music Festival: Festival Symphony Concert 2

Notes

1951 births
Living people
South African composers
South African male composers
Alumni of Rondebosch Boys' High School
20th-century South African musicians
21st-century South African musicians
20th-century male musicians
21st-century male musicians